Silver Samurai is the name of two different supervillains appearing in American comic books published by Marvel Comics, both acquaintances of Wolverine.

The character has appeared in several X-Men-related animated series and video games before making its live-action debut in the 2013 film The Wolverine.

Fictional character biography

Kenuichio Harada

Kenuichio Harada is the original Silver Samurai. The character first appeared in Daredevil #111 (July 1974), and was created by writer Steve Gerber and artist Bob Brown. A Japanese mutant who uses his powers to charge his katana and wears a samurai-style armor made of a silvery metal, he is the illegitimate son of Lord Shingen, the half-brother of Mariko Yashida, a cousin of Sunfire and Sunpyre, and a nemesis of Wolverine. While he spent most of his existence as a villain, he eventually reformed into a more heroic figure.

Shin Harada
Shingen "Shin" Harada, otherwise known as the second Silver Samurai, is Kenuichio Harada's son and named after Lord Shingen, his grandfather. He had been committing larceny with Amiko Kobayashi.

Shin later worked with Mystique to track down newly awakened mutants to join a cause. He was later recruited by Kade Killgore to be a teacher at the Hellfire Club's Hellfire Academy where he worked as a designer.

Silver Samurai later appeared as a member of Mystique's fourth incarnation of the Brotherhood of Mutants. During Magneto's fight with the Brotherhood of Mutants on Madripoor, Magneto controlled Silver Samurai into wounding Mystique.

As part of the "All-New, All-Different Marvel", Shingen Harada represented the Yashida Corporation when he attended a meeting at the Universal Bank with Tiberius Stone of Alchemax, Wilson Fisk of Fisk Industries, Sebastian Shaw of Shaw Industries, Darren Cross of Cross Technological Enterprises, Zeke Stane of Stane International, Frr'dox of Shi'ar Solutions Consolidated, and Wilhelmina Kensington of Kilgore Arms where they discussed with Dario Agger about Roxxon Energy Corporation's plans to exploit the Ten Realms of Asgard. When the true motive of the meeting was revealed, Harada attacked Dario and they almost fought, interrupted by the arrival of Exterminatrix of the Midas Foundation, resulting in Dario getting knocked out when declaring herself a new member of their assembly. He then went to an underwater station in the Southern Ocean, where he attacked the employees until encountering Thor who defeated him by smacking him repeatedly with Mjolnir. He then escaped and joined Exterminatrix in an aerial battle against soldiers attempting to rescue Dario. They later entered Roxxon Corporation HQ, where they encountered the B.E.R.S.E.R.K.E.R.S., a group of Hulk-like superhumans. While the Mindless Ones fought the B.E.R.S.E.R.K.E.R.S., Silver Samurai and Exterminatrix went to Dario's vault, attempting to take the money until Agent Solomon arrived, forcing Exterminatrix to fight the woman while Silver Samurai opened the vault. When the vault was opened, Dario transformed into Minotaur and knocked out Silver Samurai. Then, the floating island the building was located on fell down due to the activation of the Agger Imperative. While S.H.I.E.L.D. evacuated the building, Thor destroyed the island. The villains were later arrested and taken into custody.

Silver Samurai approached Old Man Logan wanting to ally in stopping the Hand's Regenix operation. He agreed in exchange that Mariko doesn't get killed and that Touku and Asami's child is taken care of. When Logan and Silver Samurai attack the Hand's Regenix operations, Silver Samurai fought Gorgon while Logan fought the Hand Ninjas to confront Mariko. After Gorgon got away, Silver Samurai injected nanites into Mariko to break the Hand's control. Afterwards, Logan and Mariko sent Silver Samurai to destroy the Regenix shipments in Madripoor.

Reception 
 In 2020, CBR.com ranked Silver Samurai 1st in their "Marvel Comics: Ranking Every Member Of Big Hero 6 From Weakest To Most Powerful" list.

In other media

Television
 The Kenuichio Harada incarnation of Silver Samurai appears in the X-Men episode "The Lotus and the Steel", voiced by Denis Akiyama. 
 The Kenuichio Harada incarnation of Silver Samurai appears in the Wolverine and the X-Men episode "Code of Conduct", voiced by Keone Young.
 The Kenuichio Harada incarnation of Silver Samurai appears in Marvel Disk Wars: The Avengers, voiced by Takanori Nishikawa in Japanese and Andrew Kishino in English.
 The Kenuichio Harada incarnation of Silver Samurai appears in Marvel's Hit-Monkey, voiced by Noshir Dalal.

Film

Variations of the Silver Samurai appears in The Wolverine (2013). The first is the Yashida clan's traditional samurai attire which is donned by Shingen Yashida (portrayed by Hiroyuki Sanada). The second is a giant, robotic suit made of adamantium operated by former soldier/billionaire Ichirō Yashida (portrayed by Haruhiko Yamanouchi (older self), and Ken Yamamura (younger self)).

Video games
 The Kenuichio Harada incarnation of Silver Samurai appears as a playable character in X-Men: Children of the Atom, voiced by Yasushi Ikeda.
 The Kenuichio Harada incarnation of Silver Samurai appears as a playable character in Marvel vs. Capcom 2: New Age of Heroes, voiced again by Yasushi Ikeda. 
 The Kenuichio Harada incarnation of Silver Samurai appears as a boss in X-Men: The Official Game, voiced by Keone Young.
 The Kenuichio Harada incarnation of Silver Samurai appears as an unlockable playable character in Lego Marvel Super Heroes, voiced by Andrew Kishino.

References

External links
 
 Silver Samurai I at Marvel Wiki
 Silver Samurai II at Marvel Wiki
 Silver Samurai I at Comic Vine
 Silver Samurai II at Comic Vine
 UncannyXmen.net Spotlight On Silver Samurai

Articles about multiple fictional characters
Villains in animated television series
Big Hero 6 characters
Characters created by Bob Brown
Characters created by Steve Gerber
Comics characters introduced in 1974
Fictional amputees
Fictional businesspeople
Fictional gangsters
Fictional henchmen
Japanese superheroes
Fictional samurai
Fictional swordfighters in comics
Marvel Comics characters who can teleport
Marvel Comics film characters
Marvel Comics male superheroes
Marvel Comics male supervillains
Marvel Comics martial artists
Marvel Comics mutants
Set index articles on comics
Wolverine (comics) characters
X-Men supporting characters